Zeta Global Holdings Corp. is a data-driven marketing technology company which was founded in 2007. Zeta offers companies a suite of multichannel marketing tools focused on creating, maintaining, and monetizing customer relationships.

Zeta Global has the industry's third largest data set (2.4B+ identities), next to Google and Facebook, powered by demographic, locational, behavioral, transactional, and predictive signals. The company went public on the New York Stock Exchange on June 10, 2021, at a US$1.7 billion valuation.

The company's headquarters is in New York City, with 15 offices worldwide, in 11 countries, including Silicon Valley, London, as well as Chennai and Hyderabad in India. Zeta has more than 1,300 employees worldwide. The company's CEO is David A. Steinberg.

Forbes Magazine reported that the company has been referred to as a 'Unicorn'  a "billion-dollar startup".
According to The Wall Street Journal, as of March 2020 the company is profitable, with annual revenues exceeding $400 million.

History
Zeta Global was founded by David A. Steinberg and former Apple Inc. CEO John Sculley in 2007 under the name 'XL Marketing'. The company changed its name to 'Zeta Interactive' in 2014, then again to 'Zeta Global' in October 2016.

As of April 2017, Zeta had bought nine companies in the past nine years. In July 2015, the company raised $125 million from Blackstone's GSO Capital Partners to grow its business through the acquisition of data startup companies.

In November 2013, Zeta acquired the Adchemy Actions division from ad tech firm Adchemy, as to incorporate their 'machine learning' based advertising platform. In January 2014, Zeta acquired Clicksquared, a Boston-based company that created 'The Hub', a SaaS-based, cross-channel campaign management platform.

In late 2015, they acquired the customer relationship management division of eBay's Enterprise operation, in a deal which sources near the company said was worth $80–90 million. CEO Steinberg said that the deal "gets us a long way toward becoming the largest customer lifecycle management platform." In August 2016, they announced that they purchased the marketing automation tool 'Acxiom Impact' from marketing technology and services company Acxiom, in a deal which sources said was worth more than $50 million.

In October 2016, Zeta Global hired Jarrod Yahes as CFO. Yahes is a former senior finance executive at EXL Service Holdings, who previously served as the CFO of Jackson Hewitt. In March 2020, Christopher Greiner became CFO of Zeta Global.

In April 2017, Zeta appointed Donald Steele as the company's first-ever CRO.
 
In April 2017, the company raised $140 Million in a large late-stage equity and debt funding round, with funds coming from GPI Capital and Franklin Square Capital Partners. Forbes reported that sources close to the company said this raised the company's valuation to $1.3 billion.

On July 18, 2017, Zeta acquired machine-learning centric platform Boomtrain. Steinberg said the company planned to integrate "its machine learning, decisioning and marketing automation in our entire marketing cloud."

On December 5, 2017, Zeta Global acquired Disqus.

In 2018-2020, Zeta made several key ad tech acquisitions.  In 2019, Zeta Global acquired Temnos, a Silicon Valley AI company. Steinberg, co-founder of Zeta Global, stated that Temnos "allows us to see everything on the Internet from an intent perspective. It lets us see what people are reading, and what is trending globally." Also in 2019, Zeta also acquired demand-side and data management platform ad tech company Sizmek after it filed for bankruptcy. The deal was estimated to be around $36 million, integrating a programmatic ad buying platform into Zeta's data software."

During this period, Zeta also acquired Rocket Fuel's data management platform, IgnitionOne's demand side platform, and PlaceIQ's managed media business to further expand its marketing tech capabilities."

In March 2021, Zeta announced an additional $222.5 million in new debt financing ahead of filing for its initial public offering.

Zeta went public on the New York Stock Exchange on June 10, 2021, at a $1.7 billion valuation under the symbol ZETA.

Products 
As of 2019, the company has a database of permission based profiles of approximately 750 million+ people. Using big data analysis, they identify which companies they should sell to, contact those people, and manage existing customers. The Zeta Marketing Platform (ZMP) is the largest omnichannel marketing platform with identity data at its core. While the company originally focused on email marketing, more recently it has expanded into the customer lifecycle management market. As of 2021, the company has a database of permission-based profiles of approximately 2.4 billion identities.

Activities and events 
On January 30, 2014, Zeta Interactive hosted a forum on changes in advertising and marketing over the years, using Apple's 1984 commercial as a benchmark. Sculley shared the panel with advertising executive David Sable, Global CEO of Young & Rubicam; Jessica Gelman, Vice President of Customer Marketing and Strategy; The Kraft Group  the owners of the New England Patriots; and Hooman Radfar, Chairman and Co-Founder of marketing firm AddThis.

Awards 
In 2014, Forbes listed Zeta Interactive as a "Most Promising Company", and in 2015 the magazine put Zeta Interactive on its list of "Top 100 Analytics Startups of 2015.

Zeta was included in Gartner Inc.'s annual "Magic Quadrant for Multichannel Campaign Management" in 2014 and 2015, and in 2017 was ranked as "Visionary" in Gartner's Magic Quadrant for Digital Marketing Hubs. In 2020, the Zeta Marketing Platform was ranked as a "Leader" in the Forrester Wave: Email Marketing Service Providers Q2 report.

References

Digital marketing companies of the United States
Software companies established in 2007
American companies established in 2007
Marketing companies established in 2007
Multinational companies based in New York City
Software companies based in New York City
Customer relationship management software companies
Software companies of the United States
2007 establishments in New York City
Companies listed on the New York Stock Exchange
2021 initial public offerings
Publicly traded companies based in New York City